Paul Dear (28 December 1966 – 8 July 2022) was an Australian rules footballer who played for the Hawthorn Football Club in the Australian Football League (AFL).

Younger brother of fellow Hawk ruckman Greg Dear, Paul was the smaller of the two; Greg stood at 199 cm to Paul's 188cm. Though giving away inches to taller opponents, Paul would occasionally be the secondary ruckman for the team. The Dear brothers were recruited when the Latrobe Valley was in the  zone. A half-forward, Dear made his debut in 1987 and played in that year's Grand Final. He filled in for the unavailable Jason Dunstall at full-forward but ended up on the losing side. 

Unable to break into the side during back-to-back premiership years of 1988 and 1989, Dear was consistently named as an emergency. 

In 1990, he got regular games, playing 23 games for the year, and his form continued into 1991. He helped Hawthorn defeat West Coast in the 1991 Grand Final with two goals and won the Norm Smith Medal. Dear almost single-handedly turned a nine-point deficit into a ten-point half-time lead by dominating across the Hawthorn half-forward line and setting up several goals.

In 2020, Dear was diagnosed with untreatable pancreatic cancer. In 2021, Dear appeared on the AFL-centred TV show The Front Bar to promote the charity. He died in July 2022, just one week before Hawthorn was to play in the "Dare to Hope" match to raise money for Pancare, a charity that Dear supported until his death. A documentary, entitled Dare to Hope, is set for release in late 2022.

Statistics

|- style=background:#EAEAEA
| scope=row | 1987 ||  || 13
| 9 || 1 || 4 || 34 || 52 || 86 || 21 || 13 || 0.1 || 0.4 || 3.8 || 5.8 || 9.6 || 2.3 || 1.4 || 0
|-
| scope=row | 1988 ||  || 13
| 0 || – || – || – || – || – || – || – || – || – || – || – || – || – || – || –
|- style=background:#EAEAEA
| scope=row | 1989 ||  || 13
| 5 || 1 || 0 || 30 || 25 || 55 || 16 || 5 || 0.2 || 0.0 || 6.0 || 5.0 || 11.0 || 3.2 || 1.0 || 0
|-
| scope=row | 1990 ||  || 13
| 23 || 32 || 13 || 199 || 172 || 371 || 102 || 48 || 1.4 || 0.6 || 8.7 || 7.5 || 16.1 || 4.4 || 2.1 || 3
|- style=background:#EAEAEA
| scope=row bgcolor=F0E68C | 1991# ||  || 13
| 23 || 23 || 22 || 188 || 151 || 339 || 88 || 31 || 1.0 || 1.0 || 8.2 || 6.6 || 14.7 || 3.8 || 1.3 || 0
|-
| scope=row | 1992 ||  || 13
| 13 || 4 || 4 || 100 || 81 || 181 || 37 || 20 || 0.3 || 0.3 || 7.7 || 6.2 || 13.9 || 2.8 || 1.5 || 0
|- style=background:#EAEAEA
| scope=row | 1993 ||  || 13
| 14 || 4 || 6 || 79 || 81 || 160 || 43 || 23 || 0.3 || 0.4 || 5.6 || 5.8 || 11.4 || 3.1 || 3.1 || 0
|-
| scope=row | 1994 ||  || 13
| 19 || 10 || 4 || 121 || 115 || 236 || 58 || 42 || 0.5 || 0.2 || 6.4 || 6.1 || 12.4 || 3.1 || 2.2 || 0
|- style=background:#EAEAEA
| scope=row | 1995 ||  || 13
| 15 || 5 || 6 || 79 || 79 || 158 || 46 || 14 || 0.3 || 0.4 || 5.3 || 5.3 || 10.5 || 3.1 || 0.9 || 2
|-
| scope=row | 1996 ||  || 13
| 2 || 0 || 1 || 4 || 5 || 9 || 2 || 1 || 0.0 || 0.5 || 2.0 || 2.5 || 4.5 || 1.0 || 0.5 || 0
|- class=sortbottom
! colspan=3 | Career
! 123 !! 80 !! 60 !! 834 !! 761 !! 1595 !! 413 !! 197 !! 0.7 !! 0.5 !! 6.8 !! 6.2 !! 13.0 !! 3.4 !! 1.6 !! 5
|}

Honours and achievements
Team
 AFL premiership player: 1991

Individual
 Norm Smith Medal: 1991
 State of Origin (Victoria 2nd XVIII team): 1990

References

External links

Profile at Hawksheadquarters.com

1966 births
2022 deaths
Australian rules footballers from Victoria (Australia)
Deaths from pancreatic cancer
Deaths from cancer in Victoria (Australia)
Hawthorn Football Club players
Hawthorn Football Club Premiership players
Norm Smith Medal winners
Victorian State of Origin players
One-time VFL/AFL Premiership players